Bjølstad or Heidal is a village in Sel Municipality in Innlandet county, Norway.

The village is the site of the historic Bjølstad Farm and the Heidal Church. Historically, this small village was the administrative centre of the former municipality of Heidal which existed from 1908 until 1965.

References

Sel
Villages in Innlandet